Alyssum serpyllifolium, the thyme-leaved alison, is a species of flowering plant in the family Brassicaceae, native to the western Mediterranean region. It is adapted to serpentine soils. The Royal Horticultural Society recommends it for rock gardens.

References

Further reading

serpyllifolium
Flora of Morocco
Flora of Algeria
Flora of Tunisia
Flora of Portugal
Flora of Spain
Flora of France
Plants described in 1798